The Temple Owls women's lacrosse is an NCAA Division I college lacrosse team representing Temple University as part of the American Athletic Conference. They play their home games at Howarth Field in Philadelphia, Pennsylvania.

Historical statistics
*Statistics through 2018 season

Individual career records

Reference:

Individual single-season records

Seasons

Postseason Results

The Owls have appeared in 17 NCAA tournaments. Their postseason record is 13-15.

References

 
Atlantic Coast Conference women's lacrosse
1975 establishments in Pennsylvania
Lacrosse clubs established in 1975